Xennellidae (or Xenellidae) is a family of nematodes belonging to the order Enoplida.

Genera:
 Xennella Cobb, 1920

References

Nematodes